The 2021–22 season was Al-Nassr's 46th consecutive season in the top flight of Saudi football and 66th year in existence as a football club. The club participated in the Pro League, the King Cup, and the AFC Champions League.

The season covered the period from 1 July 2021 to 30 June 2022.

Players

Squad information

Out on loan

Transfers and loans

Transfers in

Loans in

Transfers out

Loans out

Pre-season

Competitions

Overview

Goalscorers

Last Updated: 27 June 2022

Assists

Last Updated: 23 June 2022

Clean sheets

Last Updated: 21 May 2022

References

Al Nassr FC seasons
Nassr